Vu!, also operating as Bell TV On Demand, is a Canadian English and French language pay-per-view and Video on Demand provider that launched in October 1999 and is owned by Bell Media. Vu! is the largest PPV service provider in Canada and is available on Telus Satellite TV, Bell Satellite TV, Bell Fibe TV, and Bell Aliant FibreOP. It not only offers pay-per-view content but also features pay-per-day, pay-per-month and pay-per-year on select programming.

History 
Vu! started operations in October 1999.

On July 5, 2013, Bell Canada's media arm (and Bell TV's sister company), Bell Media, acquired control of a competing pay-per-view service, Viewers Choice, which currently primarily serves cable companies, as part of their takeover of Astral Media. In July 2014, industry website Cartt.ca reported that Viewers Choice would be shutting down on September 30, 2014. Vu! was directly unaffected by the shutdown except that it also began to serve Bell Aliant customers in place of Viewers Choice after the channel shut down.

Programming 
Vu!'s programming consists of films, concerts, live boxing, Ultimate Fighting Championship, WWE and Total Nonstop Action Wrestling, All Elite Wrestling, World Series of Poker and other special events. They also consist of select programming from AXS TV as well as various sports packages including NHL Centre Ice, NFL Sunday Ticket, NASCAR In Car, NCAA basketball, HPItv horse racing, and cricket.

Red Carpet Vu! 
In an effort to compete with the video on demand services offered by cable companies, Vu! has launched Red Carpet Vu!. This service features 8 channels with new releases and hit films playing all day with a film starting every 15 minutes.

Venus

Venus is Bell Satellite TV's adult pornography pay-per-view service, operated separately from Vu! (but under the same licence) with more expensive prices. Bell receivers can access two channels, one in English and one in French, for information on how to block all pornographic channels, including Venus. There are 15 Venus pay-per-view channels:
 11 English language PPV channels
 3 French language PPV channels
 1 PPV channel featuring gay pornography

References

External links
 Vu!

Movie channels in Canada
Bell Media networks
Pay-per-view television networks in Canada
Television channels and stations established in 1999
1999 establishments in Canada